On 26 September 1992 a Nigerian Air Force Lockheed C-130H Hercules crashed three minutes after take-off from Lagos, Nigeria. All 159 people on board were killed, including 8 foreign nationals. The aircraft was taking off at high weight and three engines failed. The aircraft was serial number 911.

Some reports claim there were 163 on board, others 174 or even 200 including some unidentified civilians, and possible military personnel who hitched a ride. In any case, a total 151 Nigerians, 5 Ghanaians, 1 Tanzanian, 1 Zimbabwean, and 1 Ugandan military officers were confirmed to have died.

References

Accidents and incidents involving the Lockheed C-130 Hercules
Accidents and incidents involving military aircraft
1992 in Nigeria
Aviation accidents and incidents in 1992
Aviation accidents and incidents in Nigeria
20th century in Lagos
September 1992 events in Africa
1992 disasters in Nigeria